Radio Tirana Klasik, formerly known as Boom Boom Radio (101.2 FM), is a classical music oriented radio station based in Tirana County, Albania, and is owned by Albania's public broadcaster RTSH.

External links
Official FB Page of Radio Tirana Klasik
Official FB page of defunct Boom Boom Radio

Radio stations in Albania
Mass media in Tirana

Radio stations established in 2017